The Shanghai–Jiading Expressway, commonly referred to as the Hujia Expressway and designated S5, is a  in the city of Shanghai, China. The expressway connects the Middle Ring Road in Baoshan District with the center of Jiading District.

Opened in October 1988, it is the oldest expressway in China. At the time, the expressway reduced the travel time from 2 hours to 30 minutes.

Route 
The Shanghai–Jiading Expressway begins at an elevated interchange with the Middle Ring Road in Baoshan District to the east and south. At the interchange, motorists can continue east on Middle Ring Road toward Zhabei District, south on Middle Ring Road toward Changning District, or descend to an intersection with Zhenbei Road and Wenshui Road, which are surface-level roadways that run under Middle Ring Road. 

The expressway traverses west to an interchange with Outer Ring Expressway in Putuo District before turning to a northwesterly direction, paralleling the route of China National Highway 204 from Putuo to Jiading District. It ends at an interchange with the G1501 Shanghai Ring Expressway in Jiading District. A short segment of expressway continues north past the interchange to a toll plaza and intersection with Yecheng Road and South Bo'le Road. South Bo'le Road, which eventually becomes Bo'le Road, is a major arterial roadway into the old city center of Jiading District. 

The expressway is tolled from just west of the Outer Ring Expressway to its western terminus in Jiading District.

Exit list

References 

Expressways in Shanghai